Zakouski may refer to:

Zakuski, Russian and Polish appetizer in buffet style
Zakouski (ballet)